El Mehrass Mosque '  is a small mosque in the east of the medina of Tunis.

Localization 
It is located in 1 Jemaa Al-Zaytuna Street, originally named the Church Street.

History 
According to the historian Mohamed Belkodja, the mosque was built during the Khurasanid  era, a local dystany that ruled Tunis between 1059 and 1158.
It was restored after the independence of the country.
At the entrance of the mosque, there are some Kufi quotes inscribed on the stones that allowed the historians to get an idea about the period of construction.
Abû El-Abas Ahmad El-Karoui was one of the imams who studied in Al-Zaytuna university and died in 1855.

References 

Mosques in Tunis
11th-century mosques